Jason Day (born March 18, 1979) is a Canadian former mixed martial artist. A professional from 2002 until 2011, he fought in the UFC, King of the Cage, the MFC, and the AFC. He is perhaps best remembered for his upset win in his UFC debut over veteran Alan Belcher.

Mixed martial arts career

Early career
Day made his professional debut in 2002 and fought on the regional circuit in Canada. After defeating UFC veteran David Loiseau via decision in 2008, Day was signed by the promotion.

Ultimate Fighting Championship
Day made his UFC debut at UFC 83 on April 19, 2008 against Alan Belcher. Despite being an underdog against Belcher, Day won via first-round TKO.

Day then faced future UFC Middleweight Champion Michael Bisping at UFC 85. Day was defeated via first-round TKO. He was next scheduled to face Jason Lambert at UFC 88, but the bout was scrapped due to Day injuring his elbow and bicep.

Day returned at UFC 96 to face Ultimate Fighter Season 7 winner Kendall Grove. He was defeated again via first-round TKO, and was subsequently released from the promotion.

Regional circuit
Upon being released from the UFC, Day returned to fight in the Canadian regional scene, going just 1-3 but losing to UFC veterans Jesse Taylor, Ovince St. Preux, and [[

On August 4, 2011 he was involved in a traffic accident while riding on his bike. Due to sustained injuries by the accident, Day could no longer compete in MMA. In 2014 the court ruled that the car driver was 90-percent at fault. The judgment awarded Day $375,000 in damages due to any potential lost earnings and emotional suffering that came with a premature end to his athletic career, from which he was granted $340,000 as the collision was ruled 10-percent his fault.

Mixed martial arts record

|-
| Loss
| align=center| 19–12
| Francis Carmont
| TKO (punches)
| Slammer In The Hammer
| 
| align=center| 1
| align=center| 2:10
| Hamilton, Ontario, Canada
| 
|-
| Loss
| align=center| 19–11
| Ovince St. Preux
| KO (punches)
| EFC 5: Summer Rumble
| 
| align=center| 1
| align=center| 0:08
| Lloydminster, Canada
|Return to Light Heavyweight.
|-
| Loss
| align=center| 19–10
| Jesse Taylor
| Submission (rear-naked choke)
| AMMA 2: Vengeance
| 
| align=center| 1
| align=center| 4:56
| Edmonton, Alberta, Canada
| 
|-
| Win
| align=center| 19–9
| Trevor Stewardson
| Submission (twister)
| Rumble in the Cage 35
| 
| align=center| 2
| align=center| 4:12
| Lethbridge, Alberta, Canada
| 
|-
| Loss
| align=center| 18–9
| Kendall Grove
| TKO (punches and elbows)
| UFC 96
| 
| align=center| 1
| align=center| 1:32
| Columbus, Ohio, United States
| 
|-
| Loss
| align=center| 18–8
| Michael Bisping
| TKO (punches)
| UFC 85
| 
| align=center| 1
| align=center| 3:42
| London, England
| 
|-
| Win
| align=center| 18–7
| Alan Belcher
| TKO (punches)
| UFC 83
| 
| align=center| 1
| align=center| 3:58
| Montreal, Quebec, Canada
| 
|-
| Win
| align=center| 17–7
| David Loiseau
| Decision (split)
| HCF: Destiny
| 
| align=center| 3
| align=center| 5:00
| Calgary, Alberta, Canada
| 
|-
| Win
| align=center| 16–7
| Ron Faircloth
| TKO (punches)
| UCW 10: X-Factor
| 
| align=center| 2
| align=center| N/A
| Winnipeg, Manitoba, Canada
| 
|-
| Win
| align=center| 15–7
| Shawn Marchand
| TKO (punches)
| RITC 26: Rumble in the Cage 26
| 
| align=center| 1
| align=center| 2:00
| Alberta, Canada
| 
|-
| Win
| align=center| 14–7
| Jonathan Goulet
| Submission (armbar)
| UCW 8: Natural Invasion
| 
| align=center| 2
| align=center| 4:12
| Manitoba, Canada
| 
|-
| Loss
| align=center| 13–7
| Patrick Côté
| TKO (punches)
| TKO 29: Repercussion
| 
| align=center| 1
| align=center| 4:05
| Montreal, Quebec, Canada
| 
|-
| Win
| align=center| 13–6
| Scott Arnold
| Submission (armbar)
| RITC 21: Seasons Beatings
| 
| align=center| 1
| align=center| 1:44
| Alberta, Canada
| 
|-
| Win
| align=center| 12–6
| Ricardeau Francois
| Submission (guillotine choke)
| KOTC: Amplified
| 
| align=center| 1
| align=center| 1:21
| Alberta, Canada
| 
|-
| Win
| align=center| 11–6
| Shawn Marchand
| TKO (punches)
| MFC: Unplugged 2
| 
| align=center| 1
| align=center| 1:54
| Alberta, Canada
| 
|-
| Win
| align=center| 10–6
| Marcus Hicks
| Submission
| RITC 19: Rumble in the Cage 19
| 
| align=center| 1
| align=center| 3:41
| Alberta, Canada
| 
|-
| Win
| align=center| 9–6
| Shane Lightle
| Submission (rear-naked choke)
| RITC 18: Rumble in the Cage 18
| 
| align=center| 1
| align=center| 1:31
| Alberta, Canada
| 
|-
| Loss
| align=center| 8–6
| Victor Valimaki
| Submission (rear-naked choke)
| MFC 10: Unfinished Business
| 
| align=center| 1
| align=center| 2:15
| Canada
| 
|-
| Win
| align=center| 8–5
| Linden Linklater
| TKO (punches)
| RITC 17: Rumble in the Cage 17
| 
| align=center| 1
| align=center| 1:52
| Alberta, Canada
| 
|-
| Win
| align=center| 7–5
| Chris Fontaine
| TKO (punches)
| UCW 4: Ultimate Cage Wars 4
| 
| align=center| 1
| align=center| N/A
| Manitoba, Canada
| 
|-
| Win
| align=center| 6–5
| MJ Rooney
| TKO (punches)
| KOTC: Karnage
| 
| align=center| 1
| align=center| 1:36
| Alberta, Canada
| 
|-
| Win
| align=center| 5–5
| Yoosef Penny
| Submission (rear-naked choke)
| MFC 9: No Excuses
| 
| align=center| 1
| align=center| 1:00
| Alberta, Canada
| 
|-
| Win
| align=center| 4–5
| Greg Rogalsky
| Submission (guillotine choke)
| KOTC: Conquest
| 
| align=center| 1
| align=center| 2:22
| Alberta, Canada
|Middleweight debut.
|-
| Loss
| align=center| 3–5
| Krzysztof Soszynski
| TKO (punches)
| RR 11: Roadhouse Rumble 11
| 
| align=center| 1
| align=center| 2:08
| Alberta, Canada
| 
|-
| Loss
| align=center| 3–4
| Ulysses Castro
| KO (punches)
| WFF 6: World Freestyle Fighting 6
| 
| align=center| 1
| align=center| 2:22
| Vancouver, British Columbia, Canada
| 
|-
| Loss
| align=center| 3–3
| Cameron Brown
| Submission (rear-naked choke)
| Roadhouse Rumble 9
| 
| align=center| 1
| align=center| N/A
| Canada
| 
|-
| Win
| align=center| 3–2
| Krzysztof Soszynski
| Decision (unanimous)
| RR 8: Roadhouse Rumble 8
| 
| align=center| 2
| align=center| 5:00
| Alberta, Canada
| 
|-
| Loss
| align=center| 2–2
| Derek Tisdale
| Submission (armbar)
| WFC: Western Freestyle Championships
| 
| align=center| 1
| align=center| N/A
| Vernon, British Columbia, Canada
| 
|-
| Loss
| align=center| 2–1
| Rodrigo Munduruca
| Submission (rear-naked choke)
| TIBF: Take it by Force
| 
| align=center| 1
| align=center| N/A
| Manitoba, Canada
| 
|-
| Win
| align=center| 2–0
| Jason Segal
| TKO (punches)
| RR 6: Roadhouse Rumble 6
| 
| align=center| 1
| align=center| N/A
| Alberta, Canada
| 
|-
| Win
| align=center| 1–0
| Jeremiah Cram
| Submission (guillotine choke)
| BTB: Border Town Brawl
| 
| align=center| 2
| align=center| N/A
| Lloydminster, Canada
|

References

External links
 
 

1981 births
Canadian male mixed martial artists
Canadian practitioners of Brazilian jiu-jitsu
Living people
Middleweight mixed martial artists
Mixed martial artists utilizing Brazilian jiu-jitsu
Sportspeople from Lethbridge
Ultimate Fighting Championship male fighters